Johann Georg Kühnhausen (also Johannes Georg Kühnhausen) (buried 25 August 1714) was a German composer.

Life
Little is known about the life of Kühnhausen. From 1660 his name is registered to the court of Duchy of Brunswick-Lüneburg in Celle where he spent the rest of his life and was buried.

Works
The only known work of Kühnhausen is Passio Christi secundum Matthäum.

Sources
Guenter Thomas's article in New Grove Dictionary of Music
Adam Adrio's article in Die Musik in Geschichte und Gegenwart
W. Engelhardt: "Kantor Kühnhausens Celler Passionsbuch und Karfreitags-Ordnung", Monatsschrift für Gottesdienst und kirchliche Kunst, xxxii (1927)

External links
 

17th-century German composers
18th-century German composers
1714 deaths
Year of birth unknown